The 2026 Women's FIH Hockey World Cup will be the 16th edition of the Women's FIH Hockey World Cup, the quadrennial world championship for women's national field hockey teams organized by the International Hockey Federation. It will be held in Wavre, Belgium and Amstelveen, Netherlands.

Host selection
The International Hockey Federation announced on 15 June 2022 that they received the following five bids for the 2026 World Cup. The winning bid will be announced on 3 November 2022.

Melbourne/Geelong, Perth, Sydney, Brisbane/Gold Coast, Australia, to be confirmed
Potchefstroom, South Africa
Uruguay

The following two bids are combined with the 2026 Men's World Cup:

Wavre, Belgium/Amstelveen, Netherlands
Potchefstroom, South Africa

Wavre, Belgium and Amstelveen, Netherlands were awarded the hosting rights on 3 November 2022.

Venues
Following is a list of all venues and host cities.

See also
 2026 Men's FIH Hockey World Cup

References

World Cup
Women's Hockey World Cup
World Cup
FIH Hockey World Cup
FIH Hockey World Cup
International women's field hockey competitions hosted by the Netherlands
International women's field hockey competitions hosted by Belgium
Sports competitions in Amstelveen
Wavre
Sport in Walloon Brabant